Barry Eugene Carter (September 12, 1944 – July 4, 2003), better known by his stage name Barry White, was an American singer and songwriter. A two-time Grammy Award winner known for his bass voice and romantic image, his greatest success came in the 1970s as a solo singer and with The Love Unlimited Orchestra, crafting many enduring soul, funk, and disco songs such as his two biggest hits: "Can't Get Enough of Your Love, Babe" and "You're the First, the Last, My Everything".

White recorded 20 studio albums during the course of his career, but multiple versions and compilations were released worldwide that were certified gold, 41 of which also attained platinum status. White had 20 gold and 10 platinum singles, with worldwide record sales in excess of 100 million records, and is one of the best-selling music artists of all time. His influences included James Cleveland, Ray Charles, Aretha Franklin, The Supremes, the Four Tops and Marvin Gaye.

Early life
White was born Barry Eugene Carter on September 12, 1944, in Galveston, Texas, United States. His father was Melvin A. White, and his mother was Sadie Marie Carter. His parents never married, so his mother gave him her last name, but he later took on the surname of his father.  He grew up in the Watts neighborhood of South Central Los Angeles, California. He was the older of two children; his brother Darryl was 13 months younger. White grew up listening to his mother's classical music collection and first took to the piano, emulating what he heard on the records.

White has often been credited with playing piano, at age 11, on Jesse Belvin's 1956 hit single, "Goodnight My Love". However, in a 1995 interview with the Boston Herald, White denied writing or arranging the song. He believed the story was an exaggeration by journalists. While White and Belvin lived in the same neighborhood, Belvin was 12 years older than White.

White attended Jacob A. Riis High School, an all boys academy in southeast Los Angeles. White's voice deepened suddenly when he was 14. He recalled: "[As a child], I had a normal squeaky kid voice. Then as a teenager, that completely changed. My mother cried because she knew her baby boy had become a man." In an 2000 interview with Conan O'Brien he further recalled: "I woke up one morning when I was 14. I spoke to my mother and I scared both of us."

White was jailed for four months at the age of 16 for stealing $30,000 worth of Cadillac tires (equivalent to about $300,000 in 2022). While in jail, he listened to Elvis Presley singing "It's Now or Never" on the radio, an experience he later credited with changing the course of his life. White had another moment of inspiration on his 18th birthday, which also was the first day back for his graduating year of high school. He skipped class to walk to Capitol Records headquarters in downtown Los Angeles, and stood across the street from the office staring for hours. Seeing the liveliness of the area it inspired him to work in Hollywood and the entertainment industry after, despite not knowing how to read or write music.

Music career

1960s
After his release from jail, White left gang life and began a musical career at the beginning of the 1960s in singing groups. He first released "Too Far to Turn Around" in 1960 as part of The Upfronts before working for various small independent labels in Los Angeles. He also recorded several singles under his own name in the early 1960s, backed by vocal groups the Atlantics (for the Rampart and Faro labels) and the Majestics (for the Linda and Jordan labels).  White had no involvement with Bob & Earl's 1963 hit single "Harlem Shuffle", a song he has sometimes been credited with producing; in his 1999 autobiography, White confirmed the song had been produced by Gene Page, who had worked with him on many of White's 1970s successes.

In 1965, White produced "Feel Aw Right" by the Bel Cantos, released on the Downey label.   He recorded his debut single, "Man Ain't Nothin'" / "I Don't Need It, released under the name Lee Barry on Downey in 1966. He also co-wrote "Together Forever", released by Pat Powdrill & the Powerdrills in 1967.

In the mid-'60s, Bob Keane of Del-Fi Records hired him as an A&R man for his new Bronco Records imprint, and White started working with the label's artists, including Viola Wills and The Bobby Fuller Four, as a songwriter, session musician, and arranger. He discovered singer Felice Taylor and arranged her song "I Feel Love Comin' On", co-written with his friend Paul Politi. It became a big hit in the UK. Other charting hits written by White and Politi for her included "It May Be Winter Outside (But in My Heart It's Spring)" and "Under the Influence of Love". Bronco issued one of White's first singles, 1967's "All in the Run of a Day", produced by Keane and White. White also wrote "Doin' the Banana Split" for TV bubblegum act The Banana Splits in 1968.

In 1969, White was signed by Forward Records of Los Angeles, a division of Transcontinental Entertainment Corporation, as a producer.

1970s as producer
In 1972, White got his big break producing a girl group he had discovered called Love Unlimited. Formed in imitative style of the Motown girl group The Supremes, the group members had gradually honed their talents with White for two years previously until they signed contracts with Uni Records. His friend Paul Politi hooked him up with music industry businessman Larry Nunes, who helped to finance their album. After it was recorded, Nunes took the recording to Russ Regan, who was the head of the Uni label owned by MCA. The album, 1972's From A Girl's Point of View We Give to You... Love Unlimited, became the first of White's string of long-titled albums and singles.

White produced, wrote and arranged their classic soul ballad "Walkin' in the Rain with the One I Love", which climbed to No. 14 in the Billboard Hot 100 Pop chart and No. 6 on the Billboard R&B chart in late 1972. It became White's first million selling single as a writer and producer. This single also reached No. 12 in the UK chart. White's voice can clearly be heard in this piece as he plays the lover who answers the phone call of the female lead.

Soon after, Regan left Uni for 20th Century Records. Without Regan, White's relationship with Uni soured. With his relationship with Uni over and Love Unlimited contract-bound with the label, White was able to switch both his production deal and the group to 20th Century Records. They recorded several other hits throughout the 1970s, "I Belong to You", which spent over five months on the Billboard R&B chart in 1974 including a week at No. 1 and "Under the Influence of Love Unlimited", which hit No. 3 on the Billboard Pop album charts.  White married the lead singer of the group, Glodean James, on July 4, 1974.

The Love Unlimited Orchestra
In 1973, White created The Love Unlimited Orchestra, a 40-piece orchestral group to be used originally as a backing band for the girl-group Love Unlimited. However, White had other plans, and in 1973 he released a single with "Love's Theme" (written by him and played by the orchestra), which reached No. 1 on the Billboard Pop charts. Later, in 1974, he made the first album of the Love Unlimited Orchestra, Rhapsody in White, containing "Love's Theme". White would continue to make albums with the orchestra, achieving some successes such as: "Rhapsody in White"; "Satin Soul"; "Forever in Love"; "Midnight Groove"; "My Sweet Summer Suite", Remake of "Theme From King Kong". The orchestra ceased to make albums in 1983, but continued to support White as a backing band.

1970s solo career
White wanted to work with another act, but decided to work with a solo male artist. While working on a few demos for a male singer, he made three song demos of himself singing and playing, but Nunes heard them and insisted that he re-record and release them himself as a solo recording artist. After arguing for days about it, White was finally persuaded to release the songs himself, although he was initially reluctant to step out behind the microphone.

He then wrote several other songs and recorded them for what eventually became an entire album of music. He was going to use the name "White Heat", but decided on using his given name instead. White was still hesitating up to the time the label copy was made. It eventually became White's first solo album, 1973's I've Got So Much to Give. It included the title track and his first solo chart hit, "I'm Gonna Love You Just a Little More Baby", which also rose to No. 1 on the Billboard R&B charts as well as No. 3 on the Billboard Pop charts in 1973 and stayed in the top 40 for many weeks.

Other chart hits by White included: 

- "Never, Never Gonna Give You Up" (No. 2 R&B, No. 7 Pop in 1973)

- "Can't Get Enough of Your Love, Babe" (No. 1 Pop and R&B in 1974)

- "You're the First, the Last, My Everything" (No. 1 R&B, No. 2 Pop in 1974)

- "What Am I Gonna Do with You" (No. 1 R&B, No. 8 Pop in 1975)

- "Let the Music Play" (No. 4 R&B in 1976)

- "It's Ecstasy When You Lay Down Next to Me" (No. 1 R&B, No. 4 Pop in 1977) 

and "Your Sweetness Is My Weakness" (No. 2 R&B in 1978) among others. 

White also had a strong following in the UK, where he scored five Top 10 hits and a No. 1 for "You're the First, the Last, My Everything".   Due to his large frame, facial hair, and deep voice, he was given the nickname "The Walrus of Love" in the UK  and in the US, "Dr. Love", "Mr. Love", "Prince of Pillow Talk", "Ambassador of Romance", "King of Disco" "The Maestro" or "Guru of Love".

After six years, White left 20th Century in 1979 to launch his own label, Unlimited Gold, with CBS/Columbia Records.

1980s
Although his success on the pop charts slowed down as the disco era came to an end, he maintained a loyal following throughout his career. Despite several albums over the next three years, he failed to repeat his earlier successes, with no singles managing to reach the Billboard Hot 100, except for 1982's "Change", climbing into the Billboard R&B Top 20 (No. 12). His label venture was exacting a heavy financial cost on White, so he concentrated on mostly touring and finally folded his label in 1983.

After four years he signed with A&M Records, and with the release of 1987's The Right Night & Barry White, the single entitled "Sho' You Right" made it to the Billboard R&B charts, peaking at No. 17.

In 1989 he released The Man Is Back! and with it had three top 40 singles on the Billboard R&B charts: "Super Lover", which made it to No. 34, "I Wanna Do It Good to Ya", which made it to No. 26, and "When Will I See You Again", which made it to No. 32.

1990s
A 1970s nostalgia fad allowed White to enjoy a renewed wave of popularity in the 1990s. After participating in the song "The Secret Garden (Sweet Seduction Suite)" from Quincy Jones's 1989 album Back on the Block, White mounted an effective comeback with several albums, each more successful than the one before. He returned to the top of the charts in 1991 with the album Put Me in Your Mix, which reached No. 8 on the Billboard R&B Albums chart and the song by the same name reached No. 2 on the Billboard R&B singles chart.

In 1994, White released The Icon Is Love, which went to No. 1 on the Billboard R&B album charts, and the single "Practice What You Preach" gave him his first No. 1 on the Billboard R&B singles chart in almost 20 years. The album was nominated for a Grammy in the Best R&B Album category, but lost to TLC's CrazySexyCool.

In 1996, White recorded the duet "In Your Wildest Dreams" with Tina Turner. 1996 also saw the release of Space Jam and its soundtrack, on which White had a duet with Chris Rock, called "Basketball Jones", a remake of Cheech & Chong's "Basketball Jones" from 1973.

White's final album, 1999's Staying Power, resulted in his last hit song "Staying Power", which placed No. 45 on the Billboard R&B charts. The single won him two Grammy Awards in the categories Best Male R&B Vocal Performance and Best Traditional R&B Vocal Performance.

His autobiography, Love Unlimited, written with Mark Eliot, was published in 1999 by Broadway Books.

Acting career

Over the course of his career, White sometimes did voice-over work for television and movies. He voiced the character Brother Bear in the film Coonskin (1975), and also played the character Sampson in the movie's live-action segments. He appeared as himself in two episodes of The Simpsons.  In the episode "Whacking Day", Bart and Lisa used his deep bass singing voice, played through loudspeakers placed on the ground, to lull and attract snakes, saving them from extermination. White was a fan of the show, and had reportedly contacted the staff about wanting to make a guest appearance. He made a second cameo in the episode "Krusty Gets Kancelled".

White played the role of a bus driver for a Prodigy commercial in 1995, and he also portrayed the voice of a rabbit in a Good Seasons salad-dressing-mix commercial, singing a song called "You Can't Bottle Love". In addition, he did some work for car commercials, including for Oldsmobile, and later on, Jeep. White also provided voice-over for Arby's Restaurant commercials on television and radio to promote its Market Fresh menu. White's voice can also be heard in Apple's first iBook commercial. White made three guest appearances on the comedy-drama television series Ally McBeal, as his music was often featured on the show in dream sequences.

Personal life

Marriages 
White was first married to his childhood sweetheart, identified as just Mary in his autobiography, by the time he was 19. They separated in 1969 and later divorced.

In 1974, White married singer Glodean James. The couple collaborated on the 1981 album Barry & Glodean. They reportedly separated in 1988, but they were still legally married until White's death in 2003, although they lived separate lives. Although estranged from White for over a decade, as his widow she was made sole executor of his estate.

Children 
White had at least nine children. By the age of 16, White had fathered two children with his first wife Mary. They had four children together. In 2017, his son Darryl White from his first marriage sued his estate claiming he was cut off financially.

White had four children with his second wife Glodean James. Their daughter Shaherah was his personal assistant. Barry Jr. played in the Love Unlimited Orchestra and was also his tour manager. White's son MacKevin worked in his publishing administration.

White had a daughter, Denise Donnell, born in 1962 to Gurtha Allen. She did not discover who her biological father was until 1988. She was accepted by White and with his help she changed her name to Denise White. In 2016, she sued White's estate after she stopped receiving money.

After White's death in 2003, his girlfriend Katherine Denton claimed her infant daughter Barriana was his biological child. Denton also claimed that she was owed money and personal items that White had promised to give her. Paternity tests revealed that he was not the father of her child and Denton subsequently lost her court case.

Health problems and death

White was overweight for most of his adult life and suffered from related health problems. He was also known to be a heavy smoker, reportedly smoking approximately 150 cigarettes a day; roughly between 7 and 8 packs.

While on tour in the summer of 1995, White nearly collapsed after a concert. He took a break from performing that fall, and on October 30 of that year, he was hospitalized after having a stroke due to high blood pressure. He was in a coma for four days but was discharged a week after coming out of it.

While touring with Earth, Wind & Fire in August 1999, White was forced to cancel a month's worth of tour dates owing to exhaustion, high blood pressure and a hectic schedule. Family, friends and associates also reported that as the 2000s began, White was in such poor health that he could hardly stand up; his last performances suffered as a result.
In September 2002, White was hospitalized with kidney failure attributed to chronic high blood pressure; he was also believed to have been diabetic. While undergoing dialysis and awaiting a kidney transplant in May 2003, White suffered a severe stroke, which forced him to retire from public life. He also suffered multiple seizures in his last few weeks.

White's unstable health prevented him from receiving a new kidney, and he died on July 4, 2003, at Cedars-Sinai Medical Center in Los Angeles after suffering cardiac arrest, aged 58 years old. His remains were cremated, and the ashes were scattered in the ocean off the California coast.

Legacy
On September 20, 2004, White was posthumously inducted into the Dance Music Hall of Fame at a ceremony held in New York. On September 12, 2013, which would have been White's 69th birthday, he was posthumously awarded the 2,506th star on the Hollywood Walk of Fame at 6914 Hollywood Boulevard in the category of recording. The show Counting Cars paid tribute to White by restoring the last car he owned for his widow, Glodean.

In an obituary referring to White by his nickname, "The Walrus of Love", the BBC recalled "the rich timbres of one of the most distinctive soul voices of his generation, about which it was once said: 'If chocolate fudge cake could sing, it would sound like Barry White.'"

Awards and nominations 
White was nominated for 11 Grammy Awards; winning two for Staying Power at the 42nd Annual Grammy Awards in 2000.

Discography

Studio albums
 I've Got So Much to Give (1973)
 Stone Gon' (1973)
 Can't Get Enough (1974)
 Just Another Way to Say I Love You (1975) 
 Let the Music Play (1976)
 Is This Whatcha Wont? (1976)
 Barry White Sings for Someone You Love (1977)
 The Man (1978)
 I Love to Sing the Songs I Sing (1979)
 The Message Is Love (1979) 
 Sheet Music (1980)
 Barry & Glodean (With Glodean White) (1981)
 Beware! (1981)
 Change (1982) 
 Dedicated (1983) 
 The Right Night & Barry White (1987) 
 The Man Is Back! (1989)  
 Put Me in Your Mix (1991) 
 The Icon Is Love (1994) 
 Staying Power (1999)

References

External links

 
 Barry White On A&M Records

1944 births
2003 deaths
20th-century African-American male singers
A&M Records artists
African-American male actors
African-American male singer-songwriters
African-American record producers
American bandleaders
American basses
American dance musicians
American disco singers
American male actors
American male voice actors
American people convicted of theft
American rhythm and blues singer-songwriters
American soul singers
Casablanca Records artists
Deaths from hypertension
Deaths from kidney failure
Downey Records artists
Grammy Award winners
Mercury Records artists
People from Galveston, Texas
Private Music artists
Record producers from California
Record producers from Texas
Singer-songwriters from California
Singer-songwriters from Texas
Singers from Los Angeles
The Love Unlimited Orchestra members
People from Watts, Los Angeles